Maurice Glasman, Baron Glasman (born 8 March 1961) is an English political theorist, academic, social commentator, and Labour life peer in the House of Lords. He is a senior lecturer in Political Theory at London Metropolitan University, Director of its Faith and Citizenship Programme and a columnist for the New Statesman, UnHerd, Tablet and Spiked. He is best known as a founder of Blue Labour, a term he coined in 2009.

Early life and education 
Glasman was born in Walthamstow, north-east London into a Jewish family and brought up in Palmers Green. His father Coleman "Collie" Glasman, a Labour Zionist, had a small toy manufacturing business that eventually collapsed while his mother Rivie Glasman, the daughter of a poor family from Stamford Hill, was a lifelong Labour supporter. Glasman was educated at Clapton Jewish Day School (now Simon Marks Jewish Primary School) and the Jews' Free School, where he won an exhibition to study Modern History at St Catharine's College, Cambridge.

A trumpeter, he became a jazz musician for four years and then gained an MA in Political Philosophy at the University of York and a PhD at the European University Institute in Florence with a thesis on market economies, which was published in 1996 under the title Unnecessary Suffering. Glasman cites political thinkers from Aristotle to the Hungarian economist and sociologist Karl Polanyi as major influences on his politics.

Career 
Glasman was a professor at Johns Hopkins University's European centre in Bologna. After his father's death in 1995, he returned to the United Kingdom. He is a senior lecturer in Political Theory at London Metropolitan University and Director of its Faith and Citizenship Programme. According to his website, "his research interests focus on the relationship between citizenship and faith and the limits of the market".

On 19 November 2010, it was announced that he would be created a life peer. Prior to his elevation, he worked for ten years with London Citizens and through this developed an expertise in community organising.

On 4 February 2011, he was created Baron Glasman of Stoke Newington and of Stamford Hill in the London Borough of Hackney by Queen Elizabeth II and was introduced into the House of Lords on 8 March 2011, where he sits on the Labour benches. His elevation to the Lords was considered something of a surprise, with Glasman admitting that he was "completely shocked" by the appointment.

Political opinions 
Having joined the Labour Party in 1976, Glasman re-engaged with Labour politics after his mother's death in 2008. Glasman coined the term Blue Labour, defined by Glasman as a "small-c" conservative form of socialism which advocates a return to what Glasman believed were the roots of the pre-1945 Labour Party by encouraging the political involvement of voluntary groups from trade unions through churches to football clubs. Blue Labour has argued that Labour should embrace patriotism and a return to community values based on trade unions and voluntary groups which he claims was evident in early Labour politics, but it was lost after 1945 with the rise of the welfare state.

In a critical assessment of Glasman's political philosophy, Alan Finlayson asserts that Glasman emphasises ethical social institution rather than moral individualism, criticises commodification and the money economy and seeks to revive the concept of the "common good" at the forefront of British politics. Glasman's role in the creation and promotion of Blue Labour is described in the book Tangled Up in Blue (2011) by Rowenna Davis. Glasman himself says that in developing the concept of Blue Labour he was inspired by the Bund, the secular Jewish Socialist Party in Lithuania, Poland and Russia founded in 1897; and the writings of 19th century German rabbi Samson Raphael Hirsch. He also points out the connections between the living wage and the demand of the Jewish trade unions in the East End for a family wage.

In April 2011, Glasman called on the Labour Party to establish a dialogue with sympathisers of the far-right English Defence League (EDL) in order to challenge their views and "to build a party that brokers a common good, that involves those people who support the EDL within our party. Not dominant in the party, not setting the tone of the party, but just a reconnection with those people that we can represent a better life for them, because that's what they want".

In July 2011, Glasman called for some immigration to be temporarily halted and for the right of free movement of labour, a key provision of the Treaty of Rome, to be abrogated, dividing opinion among Labour commentators.

Emphasising that Israel should not be "demonised", Glasman says he does not like Israel, where in his opinion "terrible things [are] going on", adding that "the Jewish settler movement is as bad as Islamic jihadist supremacists. What I see with jihadists and settlers is nationalist domination, and yuck is my general verdict". However, he accepted the visiting professorship he was offered by Haifa University, telling The Jewish Chronicle: "If people I know say they want to boycott Israel, I say they should start by boycotting me". At the 2016 Limmud conference, he suggested the Labour Party's antisemitism harked back to Jewish Marxists, who wanted to "liberate Jews" from their Judaism.

In a House of Lords debate on the European Union (Notification of Withdrawal) Bill on 20 February 2017, Lord Glasman referred to the fact he campaigned for Britain to leave the European Union in the 2016 referendum.

He was a personal friend of conservative philosopher Roger Scruton and the two inspired each other ideologically. After Scruton's death in 2020, Glasman eulogized in an obituary on UnHerd.

Personal life 
Glasman is a supporter of Jewish tradition, regularly goes to a synagogue on Shabbat and is a founder member of Stoke Newington New Shul, a congregation affiliated with the Masorti Movement. His wife Catherine, who is not Jewish, has also become "engaged with Judaism". According to The Jewish Chronicle, they keep kosher and celebrate Shabbat. He plays the trumpet and smokes rolled-up cigarettes. He lives with his wife and their four children in a flat over a clothing shop in Stoke Newington in north London.

Publications

References

External links 

 Personal page at London Metropolitan University
 Blog
 Interview with Lord Maurice Glasman, Chris Garvin, Director Young Fabians, Australia (July 2013)
 "The Blue Baron bounces back", Tom Walker, Socialist Worker (11 Oktober 2011)
 The Fabian Interview: Maurice Glasman. Way to Blue pp. 7–12, Mary Riddell, Fabian Review (Summer 2011) 
 "British Labour’s blues, Frank Bongiorno, Inside Story (26 July 2011)
 "Confronting the City", Mat Little, Red Pepper (November 2009): profile of Glasman
 "The City of London and its Tax Haven Empire": presentation by Nicholas Shaxson and Maurice Glasman at the LSE, 1 February 2011. Glasman begins speaking approximately 31 min into the recording, and jointly answers questions after the 54 min mark.

1961 births
Living people
20th-century British philosophers
21st-century British philosophers
Academics of London Metropolitan University
Alumni of St Catharine's College, Cambridge
Alumni of the University of York
Blue Labour
English Jews
English political philosophers
English political scientists
European University Institute alumni
Labour Party (UK) life peers
Life peers created by Elizabeth II
People educated at JFS (school)
People from Walthamstow